The cuneiform bad, bat, be, etc. sign is a common multi-use sign in the mid 14th-century BC Amarna letters, and the Epic of Gilgamesh. In the Epic it also has 5 sumerogram uses (capital letter (majuscule)). From Giorgio Buccellati (Buccellati 1979) 'comparative graphemic analysis' (about 360 cuneiform signs, nos. 1 through no. 598E), of 5 categories of letters, the usage numbers of the bad sign are as follows: Old Babylonian Royal letters (71), OB non-Royal letters (392), Mari letters (2108), Amarna letters (334), Ugarit letters (39).

The following linguistic elements are used for the bad sign in the 12 chapter (Tablets I-Tablet XII) Epic of Gilgamesh:

bad (not in Epic)
bat
be
mid
mit
sun
til
ziz

sumerograms:
BE
IDIM
TIL
ÚŠ
ZIZ

The following usage numbers for the linguistic elements of sign bad in the Epic are as follows: bad, (0 times), bat, (61), be, (16), mid, (7), mit, (8), sun, (1), til, (11), ziz, (8), BE, (2), IDIM, (2), TIL, (1), ÚŠ, (2), ZIZ, (1).

Instead of a large horizontal,  as seen in the (digitized form, but one type of "bad") , the sign is seen in the Amarna letters as composed of two opposite facing (triangles), the wedges. It can be seen here , Amarna letter EA 153-(lines 153:4, 11), for "King-Lord-mine", "LUGAL, Be-li-ia", or Be-lí-ia", where "bēlu" is Akkadian for "lord".

Literature examples

Amarna letters

The vassal city-state letters to the Pharaoh often reference the King (Pharaoh), as: "King, Lord-mine", where king is represented by LUGAL (king Sumerogram), for Akkadian language šarru-(sometimes LUGAL-ri, represented as "ŠÁR-ri", for king, ŠÁR=LUGAL). For the reverse of EA 362, Rib-Hadda to Pharaoh (plus lines 66–69 on clay tablet side), cuneiform sign be is used for "lord", Akkadian "bēlu". In EA 362, be is only used for the spelling of "lord".

The entire topic of EA 362 is developed on the reverse side, (starting halfway on obverse). The listing of be uses, 10-times, on the reverse (and side lines of 66–69), are as follows:

For "King, Lord-mine" (and partials):

(line 32)--LUGAL
(39)--LUGAL be-li-ia
(40)--be-li
(42)--be-li
(46)--LUGAL
(48)--LUGAL be-li

line 51
(51)--ù be-li i-di i-nu-ma

line 51
"And..Lord know, ..now ("now at this time")..."
"And..Lord know, ..[that] "now at this time"..." (a segue to the letter's ending!)

(53)--be-li-ia
(60)--LUGAL be-li-ia
(64)--LUGAL be-li-ia
(65)--LUGAL
(66)--LUGAL be-li
(68)--LUGAL be-li-ia

Besides be in EA 362, bat is used on the letter's obverse (two adjacent lines).

Form of BAD used in other signs 
The BAD/BAT sign has been used in other signs:
 With a Gesh2 sign going through it 𒐕:  for the Neo-Assyrian Cuneiform sign in Sumerian called MUŠEN, Akkadian: iṣṣūrum meaning bird, and giving the sound of ḪU.
 𒑙 as numeric value 2:  A double BAD (also called double BAT, double ESHE3, or double UŠ2)
 𒀫 AMAR (unicode 1202B) meaning calf or Mar (the Akkadian word for "son") This sign is the base for many derivatives.
 𒍘 UŠUMX (unicode u+12358)
 𒍙 UTUKI, in the suffix, again with a Gesh2 sign going through it.
 𒆰 KUL
 𒉄 NAGAR
 𒑧, 𒑨 Elamite numerical 40 and 50
 Inside various letters like 𒄓, 𒄰, 𒇀

External links
Use of be, for Akkadian "Lord", specifically "King, Lord-mine"., (Amarna letter EA 153, lines 153:4, 11)

References

Buccellati, Giorgio. Comparative Graphemic Analysis of Old Babylonian and Western Akkadian, from Ugarit-Forschungen 8, (Neukirchen-Vluyen).
Moran, William L. 1987, 1992. The Amarna Letters. Johns Hopkins University Press, 1987, 1992. 393 pages.(softcover)
 Parpola, 1971. The Standard Babylonian Epic of Gilgamesh, Parpola, Simo, Neo-Assyrian Text Corpus Project, c 1997, Tablet I thru Tablet XII, Index of Names, Sign List, and Glossary-(pp. 119–145), 165 pages.(softcover)-(Volume 1)
Rainey, 1970. El Amarna Tablets, 359-379, Anson F. Rainey, (AOAT 8, Alter Orient Altes Testament 8, Kevelaer and Neukirchen -Vluyen), 1970, 107 pages.

Cuneiform signs
Akkadian language - three letter syllables